The Zenit-3SL is an expendable carrier rocket operated by Sea Launch. First flown in 1999, it has been launched 36 times, with three failures and one partial failure. It is a member of the Zenit family of rockets, and is built by the Yuzhnoye Design Bureau. RKK Energia produces the Block DM-SL upper stage, whilst the payload fairing is produced by Boeing. Launches are conducted from the Ocean Odyssey platform anchored on the equator in the Pacific Ocean, at a point with 154°W longitude, about 370 kilometres east of Kiritimati.

The Zenit-3SL design began in the late 1980s as the Zenit-3, a proposed replacement for the Proton-K, which would have used a Zenit-2 rocket with a Block D upper stage. This proposal was shelved after the dissolution of the Soviet Union, as Russia inherited the space programme, however the Zenit was manufactured in Ukrainian SSR. Boeing became involved in the programme in 1994. The design was subsequently modified, with a modified version of the Block DM replacing the Block D.

Sea Launch integrates the rockets in California, and transfers them to Odyssey via the Sea Launch Commander for transportation to the launch site. Once at the launch site, the rocket is erected on the platform, and a three-day countdown is initiated. The countdown is fully automated, and personnel are evacuated from the launch platform to Commander prior to launch.

Zenit-3SL launches predominantly carry communications satellites into geosynchronous transfer orbits. As of 2009, the only payload to be launched by a Zenit-3SL that was not a communications satellite was a DemoSat, on the maiden flight. The only launch to be conducted to an orbit other than GTO was that of ICO F-1, which was intended to be placed into medium Earth orbit, however the rocket failed to reach orbit.

Reliability
Of thirty-six rockets launched, three have failed, with a fourth placing its payload into an incorrect, but recoverable orbit. The first failure occurred during the third flight, on 12 March 2000, when a software error resulted in the premature cutoff of the second stage, leaving the ICO F-1 satellite unable to reach orbit.

On 29 June 2004, during the launch of Apstar 5, the upper stage shut down 54 seconds early due to a wiring fault, leaving the satellite in a lower than planned orbit. The spacecraft raised itself to the correct orbit by means of its onboard manoeuvring engines, at the expense of fuel intended for stationkeeping once in the correct orbit.

On 30 January 2007, a Zenit-3SL exploded on the launch pad after an engine failure caused by debris in the turbopump. The payload on that flight was the NSS-8 communications satellite for SES New Skies. This caused a considerable amount of downtime whilst damage to the launch platform was repaired.

On 1 February 2013, during the launch of Intelsat-27, a Zenit-3SL launch vehicle suffered a premature engine shutdown, as the rocket strayed from its lift-off trajectory, plunging into the Pacific Ocean shortly after launch.

See also

 List of software bugs

References

Zenit (rocket family)
Vehicles introduced in 1999